Masudabad may refer to:
 Masudabad, Kurdistan
 Masudabad, Lorestan
 Masudabad, Qazvin
 Masudabad, West Azerbaijan